The non-marine molluscs of Laos are a part of the fauna of Laos (wildlife of Laos). A number of species of molluscs are found in the wild in Laos. Laos is landlocked country, so there are no marine molluscs.

Almost all groups of the land snail fauna in Laos have been less-well studied than those of neighbouring areas. The Lao People’s Democratic Republic, until recently encompassed some of the most significant forest areas remaining in Southeast Asia such as mountainous areas in the north and limestone karsts in central area, and some of the most intact biota left in Asia. Those habitat characteristics also harbor diverse of terrestrial molluscan fauna.

Freshwater gastropods 
Freshwater gastropods in Laos include:

Viviparidae
 Filopaludina martensi (Frauenfeld, 1864)
 Filopaludina filosa (Reeve, 1863)
 Filopaludina sumatrensis (Dunker, 1852)

Pachychilidae
 Sulcospira housei (I. Lea, 1856)

Pomatiopsidae
 Neotricula aperta (Temcharoen, 1971)

Land gastropods 
Land gastropods in Laos include:

Cyclophoridae
 Cyclophorus dilatatus Heude, 1886
 Cyclophorus floridus (Pfeiffer, 1854)
 Cyclophorus speciosus (Philippi, 1847)
 Scabrina franzhuberi Thach, 2020
 Scabrina laotica Möllendorff, 1897
 Scabrina patera (L. Pfeiffer, 1854)

Clausiliidae
 Garnieria huleschheliae Grego & Szekeres, 2011
 Lindholmiola ahuiri Grego & Szekeres, 2011
 Phaedusa pygmaea Grego & Szekeres, 2011

Diapheridae
 Laoennea carychioides Páll-Gergely, A. Reischütz & Maassen in Páll-Gergely, A. Reischütz, Maassen, Grego & Hunyadi, 2020
 Sinoennea angustistoma Páll-Gergely, A. Reischütz & Maassen in Páll-Gergely, A. Reischütz, Maassen, Grego & Hunyadi, 2020
 Sinoennea euryomphala Inkhavilay & Panha in Inkhavilay, Sutcharit, Tongkerd & Panha, 2016
 Sinoennea infantilis Páll-Gergely & Grego in Páll-Gergely, A. Reischütz, Maassen, Grego & Hunyadi, 2020
 Sinoennea lizae Maassen, 2008
 Sinoennea ljudmilena Páll-Gergely in Páll-Gergely, A. Reischütz, Maassen, Grego & Hunyadi, 2020
 Sinoennea otostoma Páll-Gergely, A. Reischütz & Maassen in Páll-Gergely, A. Reischütz, Maassen, Grego & Hunyadi, 2020
 Sinoennea variabilis Páll-Gergely & Grego in Páll-Gergely, A. Reischütz, Maassen, Grego & Hunyadi, 2020

Streptaxidae - 12 species of Streptaxidae are known from Laos
 Discartemon discus (Pfeiffer, 1853)
 Haploptychius blaisei (Dautzenberg & Fischer, 1905)
 Haploptychius pellucens (Pfeiffer, 1863)
 Haploptychius fischeri (Morlet, 1887)
 Haploptychius porrectus (Pfeiffer, 1863)
 Indoartemon diodonta Inkhavilay & Panha, 2016
 Indoartemon tridens (Möllendorff, 1898)
 Perrottetia aquilonaria Siriboon & Panha, 2013
 Perrottetia daedaleus (Bavay & Dautzenberg, 1908)
 Perrottetia dugasti (Morlet, 1892)
 Perrottetia megadentata Inkhavilay & Panha, 2016
 Perrottetia unidentata Inkhavilay & Panha, 2016
 Stemmatopsis dolium Do, 2021

Plectopylidae - 3 species are known from Laos
 Gudeodiscus messageri (Gude, 1909)
 Hunyadiscus saurini Páll-Gergely, 2016
 Naggsia laomontana (L. Pfeiffer, 1862)

Freshwater bivalves
Freshwater bivalves in Laos include:

See also
Lists of molluscs of surrounding countries:
 List of non-marine molluscs of China
 List of non-marine molluscs of Vietnam
 List of non-marine molluscs of Cambodia
 List of non-marine molluscs of Thailand
 List of non-marine molluscs of Myanmar

References
This article includes CC-BY-4.0 text from the reference

Molluscs
Laos